Abu'l-Harith Muhammad was ruler of Khwarazm for a period in 1017. The son of Abu al-Hasan Ali, he was the last member of the Iranian Ma'munid dynasty to rule Khwarazm.

In 1017, a young Muhammad was declared shah by the murderers of his uncle Abu'l Abbas Ma'mun. Mahmud of Ghazna, who had been Ma'mun's brother-in-law, was afforded a pretext for invading and a force was assembled in northern Khurasan. The Khwarazamis were unable to provide any effective resistance, and Muhammad was captured and imprisoned; Khwarazm therefore became a part of the Ghaznavid Empire. After taking vengeance on the Ma'mun's murderers Mahmud installed a Turk, the hajib Altun Tash, as governor of the province.

Sources
 

Khwarezmid rulers
11th-century monarchs in Asia
11th-century Iranian people
Ma'munids
Year of death unknown